Yamanto is a suburb of Ipswich in the City of Ipswich, Queensland, Australia.  At the 2016 Australian census the suburb recorded a population of 4,906.

History 
The origin of the suburb is from a former  1860s cotton plantation which was originally spelt as 'Yamahanto', the property jointly owned by Queensland's first government medical officer Henry Challinor (1814–1882) and his cousin George Miles Challinor (1832–1888).  Previous names used for this area were Mine Accident, Loamside and Yahmahnto. The names were given to the railway station in the Yamanto area on the now defunct Dugandan railway line.

On 1 January 2010, Amberley State School relocated and renamed as Amberley District State School at Yamanto. The school originally opened in 1863 under the name Warrill Creek State School and was renamed Amberley State School in 1903.

In 2015 this suburb is seeing a growth corridor being developed in the adjacent Ripley Valley Ripley, Queensland called Ecco Ripley. In conjunction with the expansion of the nearby RAAF Base Amberley the suburb is experiencing an influx of businesses as well as redevelopment of existing businesses.

At the 2016 Australian Census the suburb recorded a population of 4,906.

Education 
Amberley District State School is a government primary (P-6) school for boys and girls at 37 Deebing Creek Road. In 2017, the school had an enrolment of 807 students with 57 teachers (52 full-time equivalent) and 40 non-teaching staff (25 full-time equivalent). Being on the south-eastern fringe of the Ipswich metropolitan area, the school has students from both the suburbs and the rural area. Approximately one quarter of the students have a parent in the defence forces, many serving at the air base; these children may have lived in many other places due to their parents' deployments.

References

External links 
 

Suburbs of Ipswich, Queensland